Oh Se-jong (Hangul: 오세종, Hanja: 呉世種) (9 October 1982 – 27 June 2016) was a South Korean short track speed skater who won gold in the 5000 m relay at the 2006 Winter Olympics in Turin. He also competed in 5000 m relay at the 2002 Winter Olympics in Salt Lake City. He died in a traffic accident on 27 June 2016 in Seoul, South Korea.

References

External links 
 

1982 births
2016 deaths
South Korean male short track speed skaters
Olympic short track speed skaters of South Korea
Olympic gold medalists for South Korea
Olympic medalists in short track speed skating
Short track speed skaters at the 2002 Winter Olympics
Short track speed skaters at the 2006 Winter Olympics
Medalists at the 2006 Winter Olympics
Asian Games gold medalists for South Korea
Asian Games medalists in short track speed skating
Short track speed skaters at the 2003 Asian Winter Games
Medalists at the 2003 Asian Winter Games
World Short Track Speed Skating Championships medalists
Dankook University alumni
Road incident deaths in South Korea
21st-century South Korean people